The 1705th Air Transport Group is an inactive United States Air Force unit. Its last was assigned to the Western Transport Air Force, Military Air Transport Service, stationed at McChord Air Force Base, Washington. It was inactivated on 18 June 1960. Upon inactivation, most personnel and equipment reassigned to 62d Air Transport Wing.

History
Established in August 1950 by Military Air Transport Service as part of its Continental Division. Initially equipped with C-54 Skymasters providing transport of equipment and supplies to Ladd AFB and Elmendorf AFB, Alaska Territory. Was discontinued in October 1951 when McChord AFB was reassigned from Continental Air Command to Air Defense Command under the "one base, one wing" policy.

MATS operations continued under provisional organization until 1705th Air Transport Group could be organized and activated in January 1952. Received new C-124C Globemaster II aircraft upon activation of a group, began the transition to new aircraft, becoming operational in July. Assigned to MATS Pacific Division conducting heavy global strategic airlift throughout the Pacific and South Asia, including Hawaii and Alaska. 1705th Air Traffic (later Terminal) Squadron activated on 1 February 1953 for the operation of McChord personnel aerial port and passenger terminal.

Reorganized in July 1955, 34th ATS inactivated due to budget restraints after transitioning to C-118 aircraft; 32d ATS operated C-124Cs, 33d ATS began MATS passenger service to aerial ports in Hawaii and Japan in 1955 using C-118 Liftmasters reassigned from inactivated 34th ATS.

Inactivated in 1960 when senior Twenty-Second Air Force 62d Troop Carrier Wing was assigned to McChord from Larson AFB, Washington due to Strategic Air Command assumed control of Larson. Assets reassigned to 62d TCW.

Lineage
 Established as: 1705th Air Transport Wing on 1 August 1950
 Activated on 24 August 1950
 Discontinued on 1 October 1951, personnel and equipment assigned to: North Pacific Air Transport Wing, (Provisional)
 Established as 1705th Air Transport Group, 1 January 1952
 Redesignated: 1705th Air Transport Group (Heavy), 24 January 1952
 Organized on: 24 January 1952, assuming personnel and equipment of North Pacific Air Transport Wing, (Provisional)
 Inactivated on 18 June 1960, personnel and equipment assigned to: 62d Air Transport Wing.

Assignments
 Continental Division, Military Air Transport Service, 24 August 1950 – 1 October 1951
 Pacific Division, Military Air Transport Service, 1 January 1952
 Western Transport Air Force, 1 July 1958 – 18 June 1960

Components
 61st Troop Carrier Group
 Attached: 24 August – 10 December 1950
 Assigned: 1 January – 1 October 1951 (Deployed entire period to 315th Air Division, FEAF)

 1740th Air Transport Squadron, 5 September 1951
 Redesignated: 32d Air Transport Squadron, 20 July 1952 – 8 June 1960
 Inactivated, assets to 4th Air Transport Squadron, 13 June 1960

 1280th Air Transport Squadron, 7 March 1952 – 20 July 1952
 Redesignated: 33d Air Transport Squadron, 20 July 1952 – 8 June 1960
 Inactivated, assets to 7th Air Transport Squadron, 13 June 1960

 1284th Air Transport Squadron, 1 June 1952
 Redesignated: 34th Air Transport Squadron, 20 July 1952 – 1 July 1955
 Inactivated, assets to 8th Air Transport Squadron, 13 June 1960

 1286th Air Transport Squadron, 24 January 1952 – 7 March 1952
 1289th Air Transport Squadron, 24 January 1952 – 7 March 1952
 1291st Air Transport Squadron, 7 March 1952 – 20 July 1952
 77th Air Transport Squadron, 24 September 1952 – 19 November 1953

Stations
 McChord Air Force Base, Washington, 1 August 1950 – 18 June 1960

Aircraft
 C-54 Skymaster, 1950–1953
 C-124 Globemaster II, 1952–1960 (32d ATS only after 1 July 1955)
 C-118 Liftmaster, 1955–1960 (33d ATS)

References

 Mueller, Robert, Air Force Bases Volume I, Active Air Force Bases Within the United States of America on 17 September 1982, Office of Air Force History, 1989

Air transport groups of the United States Air Force
Four digit groups of the United States Air Force
Military units and formations in Washington (state)
1950 establishments in the United States